Running Out of Time (literal title: Hidden War) is a 1999 Hong Kong action thriller film produced and directed by Johnnie To and starring Andy Lau as a cancer-ridden criminal who challenges a police negotiator, played by Lau Ching-wan, to a 72-hour battle of wits and courage. Andy Lau won his first Hong Kong Film Award for Best Actor in 2000 for his performance in the film. The film was followed by a sequel, Running Out of Time 2, which was released in 2001.

Plot

 
Cheung Wah is diagnosed as suffering from late-stage cancer and given four weeks to live by his doctor. As Chueng eats at a diner, Inspector Ho Sheung-sang, a police negotiator, has been called to the scene of a bank robbery standoff that's being bungled by his inept boss, Wong Kai-fat. Ho goes in to negotiate with the robbers. After goading them to release the injured hostages first, a man amongst the hostages stands up and shoots the robbers dead. The man claims to be an off-duty police officer, but Ho realizes that the man is the mastermind of the robbery. Ho convinces the man that it is impossible to shoot him and get away with it as his fingerprints would be all over the murder weapon. As Ho leaves the crime scene to grab some breakfast, a shot rings out and Ho tells Wong that the robbery mastermind has committed suicide.

Cheung takes an interest in Ho, who he discovers was a former member of the Special Duties Unit. Cheung then stages his own robbery of a finance company to get in contact with Ho. When Ho finally arrives, Cheung proposes that they play a three-day long game. Cheung shoots the finance company manager, and Ho and the police give chase until Cheung stalls them enough to make an escape with a bomb, which turns out to be fake. It is revealed the finance manager is still alive and was only shot with messy red looking paint. Cheung makes his escape by posing as a cop.

Ho meets with Cheung after posing as a taxi driver. Amazed at Ho's ploy, Cheung will admit defeat at the game if Ho can take him to the police station before three days are over. Cheung then pulls a gun and starts shooting out the window. When Ho slams the brakes, Cheung flees and jumps aboard to mini-bus.

Meanwhile, a man known only as Baldy is having a diamond that he had stolen appraised by the old man who was taking pictures of Ho earlier. The two Americans who stole the diamond for him ask for more money. Baldy pulls out his gun and points it at the old man, who confirms its authenticity. Baldy then kills the two Americans and takes the diamond. Ho returns to the finance company for further questioning, and sees Baldy entering the office space next door. He tries to get in, but it stopped by one of Baldy's men.

As Cheung watches a video feed of the vault at Baldy's office, he puts a screw inside a box. As he takes a drink, he coughs out blood. Ho tries to reason why Cheung held up the finance company and not the jewelry or antique stores in the building and why Cheung chose him for his game. As he leaves for the day, Ho receives a Cheung's package. He meets up with his friend, the Head of Interpol, who's given him information on Baldy, who's wanted for possession of explosives, and one Peter Cheung, the old man who took pictures of him and appraised the diamond. Peter Cheung was Baldy's boss until Baldy kicked him out.

More focused on the case, he skips having dinner with her to break into Baldy's office. When trying to get in, he's turned away by security, who's told by Wong that he's not on the case. Ho sneaks in anyway as Cheung watches him on video feeds. Using a packet of dairy creamer he took from security, Ho enters the finance company and finds the grate that Cheung's screw comes from. Going through the vents, he finds men that Baldy had to keep an eye on the diamond and Cheung's video equipment, which Cheung uses to give away Ho's entrance. Ho tries to escape, but Cheung calls him and leads him to an emergency door that turns out to be a dead end. Ho tries to pick the lock on the emergency door, which is opened by the guy who he encountered earlier when he tried to get into the office.

Knowing that Baldy will come down to get the diamond out of there, Cheung reveals a car identical to Baldy's. One of Baldy’s henchmen sees the car, assuming that Baldy is in it. As the henchmen approaches towards the car, Cheung takes the diamond, posing as Baldy with the bald cap and knocks the henchmen out. Ho and Baldy's men give chase as Cheung flees away from them. As both Ho and Cheung get fired on by Baldy's men, the two are amazed at each other's resilience. They work together to get out of the predicament, but Ho realizes that now he's the one with a gun and Cheung is the one driving. Cheung reiterates that if Ho can get him to the police station, he wins. However, Cheung drives the car into a wall. After the collision, both men try their hardest to get the diamond as they both feel wobbly after the crash. Ho reaches towards the diamond but collapses, which lead to Cheung walking away with it. However, Cheung drops his painkilling pills while trying to get the diamond.

After Ho gets checked up, Wong, who thinks the pills are Ho's, tries to talk to him. Ho's Interpol friend comes and brings him more information on Peter Cheung, who died a year ago, and a photo of Cheung, his son. Cheung, who has been masquerading as his father, sends Baldy proof that he has the diamond and will give it back for $20 million HK. Ho meets with Cheung at the diner, asking why he's still playing with him even though he's got the diamond and has avenged his father. Ho gives him a minute to give him a good reason not to arrest him now. Cheung wants to have Ho arrest Baldy, but realizes that Ho isn't doing this for fame or a promotion. Cheung then taunts Ho, saying that he's beating Ho in their little game. Ho lets him leave so they can finish their game.

Cheung takes a bus, where he meets the woman from earlier again. The bus is pulled over by the police, and the woman invites Cheung over like before. She takes him to a restaurant, but he leaves when he starts coughing up blood.

Cheung has set the place to make the exchange for the diamond at a bowling alley, which is being staked out by Ho, Wong and the police. Ho bumps into the same henchman he's been running into, who still doesn't recognize him. Cheung has Ho make the exchange for him, but Baldy has Cheung, who's disguised as a woman, get the money. Ho tries to get Wong to check in on the money exchange, but Wong doesn't get the message. Cheung, who's taken out Baldy's man and the cop while getting the money, takes off his disguise and makes the exchange himself, telling Ho that the "woman" is conning him. Baldy takes Cheung's bag, which holds a bowling ball, and throws it on the floor in rage, revealing diamonds inside. The police move in and arrest Baldy for stealing the diamonds from the finance company next door.

Cheung leaves the scene with the diamond and the money. Ho catches up with Cheung, finally arrests him and prepares to take him to the police station. Cheung reveals another "bomb" and pulls out another detonator like the one before. Ho calls him on his bluff and presses the detonator, which starts a timer on the bomb. Cheung, who knows he's going to die soon, wishes that he not die in a jail cell, so Ho stops and gets out of the car, seeing as Cheung is dying in the car. The timer reaches zero, which starts up the car and Cheung escapes again. When Wong berates Ho for letting Cheung get away again, Ho simply ignores him and goes to grab something to eat. Cheung, playing dead, drives away, smiling.

Ho reads in the newspaper that someone using his name donated HK$20 million to a children's cancer foundation. He hops on a bus and meets the woman Cheung kept running into wearing the diamond. Ho admires the diamond, though she brushes it off as something cheap. He asks who gave it to her, and she says she hasn't seen him in a while. Ho tells her to hold on to it.

Cast
 Andy Lau as Cheung Wah
 Lau Ching-wan as Inspector Ho Sheung-sang
 Yoyo Mung as Leung Yuen-ting (Girl on the Mini Bus)
 Waise Lee as Baldy
 Benz Hui as Chief Inspector Wong Kai-fat
 Lam Suet as Baldy's Henchman
 Ruby Wong as Head of the Interpol
 Ai Wai as Cop at bank
 Hung Wai-leung as Mr. Lee
 Lam Wai-kin as Mr. Hui - Negotiator
 Law Ching-ting as Baldy's thug
 Lee Sau-kei as Cheung's doctor
 So Yan-tin as Ho's subordinate
 Robert Sparks as an American Diamond Dealer
 Wong Wan-woo as Office building security guard
 Yau Man-shing as Bank Robber
 Yee Tin-hung as Bank robber

Awards and nominations

Notes

External links
 

1999 films
1999 action thriller films
1999 crime thriller films
Hong Kong action thriller films 
Hong Kong crime thriller films
Police detective films
1990s Cantonese-language films
China Star Entertainment Group films
Milkyway Image films
Films about cancer
Hong Kong films about revenge
Films directed by Johnnie To
Films set in Hong Kong
Films shot in Hong Kong
Films with screenplays by Yau Nai-hoi
1990s Hong Kong films